Anas Mostafa is an Egyptian fencer. At the 2012 Summer Olympics he competed in the Men's foil, but was defeated in the first round.

References

Egyptian male foil fencers
Year of birth missing (living people)
Living people
Olympic fencers of Egypt
Fencers at the 2012 Summer Olympics